Qhapaq negro (Quechua qhapaq noble, principal, mighty, negro Spanish for black / also refers to person with sub-Saharan African or "black" ancestry) is a traditional dance in the Cusco Region in Peru. It is performed at festivals such as Mamacha Carmen in Paucartambo, celebrating Our Lady of Mount Carmel. and the Festividad de la Virgen del Rosario (Festival of the Virgin of the Rosary) in the town of Huallhua, San Salvador District, Calca Province, Cusco Department.

See also 
 Ch'unchu
 Qhapaq Qulla
 Saqra

References 

Peruvian dances
Native American dances
Cusco Region